Ellen's Acres is a short-lived American animated television series for preschool-age children, which exclusively premiered weekly on Cartoon Network and in the United Kingdom, the show airs on Cartoonito. Animation Collective produced the series. It originally aired on September 29, 2006 on Cartoon Network in the United States, airing at 9:30 a.m. ET/PT, but was pulled from the schedule after February 5, 2007.

Format
Each episode begins with Ellen narrating the adventure she had in her imagination, but she says, "Actually...", and the scene changes to a desert area, and Ellen says, "I had just gotten off the bus from school and was saying goodbye to Mateo, my bus driver."  She then says goodbye to the unseen driver who closes the bus doors, honks the horn twice, and drives off.

Ellen then says hello to her friend, a tire, and carries a feather duster, two useful props in her adventures, then takes them to the hotel offices, where her parents ask how school was and Ellen explains the first adventure. Ellen then sees what her parents are up to (finding a fossil, fixing a fan because the air conditioning broke, etc.) which leads into further imaginary adventures based on chores she's been asked to do.

Characters

 Ellen – The protagonist of the series, a five-year-old girl who moved to Nevada with her parents and has a very vivid imagination.  She has orange hair, a gap in her tooth, carries a backpack, wears a light green T-shirt with a daisy, a denim skirt, a pair of mismatched socks (one with two green stripes on her left leg and one with a red and blue stripe on the right leg) and black mary jane shoes. Born in Los Angeles, California, Ellen plays with a Hercules 17 steel-reinforced all-season tire she befriended in nursery school and a mauve-colored hypoallergenic feather duster as her playthings, theatrical company and posse.  Emily Corrao is the voice of Ellen.
 Ellen's parents – Mom, a sports lawyer and former agent, and Dad, an ex-professional skateboarder and amateur geologist, moved to this bucolic desert location near mines forty miles from Tonopah, Nevada after he completed his career in athletics when they decided to settle down.  Together, they run the Emerald Acres Hotel.  Evelyn Lanto is the voice of Mom, while Marc Thompson is the voice of Dad.
 Cooter and Connie – The heart and soul of Emerald Acres, Cooter is the resident handyman and Connie is the maid in charge of the place.  Vibe Jones voices Connie while Michael Alston Bailey is the voice of Cooter.
 Mateo – Ellen's unseen bus driver, who drops her off at the hotel at the beginning of every episode.

Episodes

Season 1

Season 2

References

External links
 

2000s American animated television series
2006 American television series debuts
2007 American television series endings
Cartoon Network original programming
Cartoonito original programming
American children's animated adventure television series
American children's animated fantasy television series
American flash animated television series
Animated television series about children
English-language television shows
Television shows set in Nevada